Discovery 1 may refer to:

 Discovery 1, a school that merged with Unlimited Paenga Tawhiti to become the Ao Tawhiti state school, based in Christchurch, New Zealand.
 Land Rover Discovery 1, a first-generation Discovery SUV car model by Land Rover.
 NEAR Shoemaker, the first mission of the Discovery program.